The Criminal Justice (Scotland) Act 2016 (2016 asp 1) is an Act of the Scottish Parliament which reformed criminal practice and procedure in Scotland. The act was intended to "modernise and enhance the efficiency of the Scottish criminal justice system".

Background
In October 2010, following the ruling in Cadder v HM Advocate, a Supreme Court judgement ruling the lack of access to a solicitor in law for persons detained by police under section 14(1) of the Criminal Procedure (Scotland) Act 1995 unlawful, the Scottish Government asked the Lord President to nominate a single High Court judge to lead an independent review of Scottish criminal law and practice. The Lord President of the Court of Session at the time, Lord Hamilton, subsequently nominated Lord Carloway, who was himself appointed Lord President in 2015. The Carloway Review was subsequently published on 17 November 2011, and its recommendations led to the introduction of the Criminal Justice (Scotland) Bill before the Scottish Parliament by Kenny MacAskill MSP, Cabinet Secretary for Justice for the Scottish Government on 20 June 2013.

The Criminal Justice (Scotland) Bill was passed by the Scottish Parliament on 8 December 2015, and received royal assent on 6 April 2020. The Act came into force in various stages between 2016 and 2019, with subsequent amendments.

Contents
Part 1 of the Act reforms the powers of the police in Scotland in relation to arrest and detention. Previous common law powers of arrest and separate statutory powers of detention were replaced by section 1 of the Criminal Justice (Scotland) Act 2016, a single statutory power of arrest similar to section 24 of the Police and Criminal Evidence Act 1984 in England and Wales. Section 3 provides that all persons arrested under section 1 are cautioned and told of the reason for their arrest. Part 1 of the act also ensured that all persons in police custody are provided with the right to access a solicitor, after the  ruling in the case of Cadder v HM Advocate, which preceded the Carloway Review. Furthermore, section 50 of the Act places a duty onto the police to ensure that a person is not "unreasonably or unnecessarily held in police custody".

Part 2 of the Act introduces new legislation in relation to the use of stop and search by police in Scotland. It abolishes a 'voluntary stop and search', where a person was able to voluntarily submit themselves to a stop and search by police. This police power had proved controversial in its use, particularly on children, in the years leading up to its abolition. The Act provides that police only have the power to stop and search any person in accordance with a legal power to do so or a warrant enabling them to do so. This was enshrined in the Code of Practice on the Exercise by Constables of Powers of Stop and Search of the Person in Scotland, brought into force by section 77 of the Act on 11 May 2017.

The Act also fulfilled a promise by the Scottish Government to increase the maximum sentence for possession of an offensive weapon, as well as having an article with a blade or point, under the Criminal Law (Consolidation) (Scotland) Act 1995.

References

Acts of the Scottish Parliament 2016
Governance of policing in the United Kingdom
Law enforcement in Scotland
Law enforcement in the United Kingdom
Scottish criminal law